The Malaysia Nuclear Agency (Agensi Nuklear Malaysia, ANM) is a Malaysian nuclear technology research facility located in Bangi, Selangor.

ANM introduces and promotes the application of nuclear science and technology for national development.

History 
Established on 19 September 1972, ANM was then known as the Centre for Application of Nuclear Malaysia (CRANE). It was formally named Tun Ismail Atomic Research Centre (PUSPATI).

In June 1983, PUSPATI was placed under the patronage of the Prime Minister and was called Nuclear Energy Unit (UTN). It was placed under Ministry of Science, Technology and Environment in October 1990. In August 1994, its name was changed to Malaysian Institute for Nuclear Technology Research (MINT).

On 28 September 2006, following its restructuring, MINT was given a new identity, which is Malaysian Nuclear Agency. Its strategic location, near higher learning institutions. It is in close proximity to the National Administration Centre, Putrajaya, and the Multimedia Super Corridor, Cyberjaya.

The rebranding followed mass restructuring and the re-alignment of its core business towards establishing nuclear power in Malaysia as an alternative form of renewable energy.

Organisational Function  
ANM functions are to:
Conduct research and development (R&D), services and training in the field of nuclear technology for national development;
Encourage application, transfer and commercialisation of nuclear technology; and,
Coordinate and manage the national and international nuclear affairs, and act as the liaison agency with International Atomic Energy Agency (IAEA) and Comprehensive Nuclear-Test-Ban Treaty Organization (CTBTO).

External links 
- Malaysia Nuclear Agency websites

Hulu Langat District
Federal ministries, departments and agencies of Malaysia
Research institutes in Malaysia
Nuclear research institutes
Science and technology in Malaysia
Scientific organisations based in Malaysia
Ministry of Energy, Technology, Science, Climate Change and Environment (Malaysia)
2005 establishments in Malaysia
Government agencies established in 2005
Research institutes established in 1972
1972 establishments in Malaysia